Olaf Ussing (28 April 1907 – 4 January 1990) was a Danish film actor. He appeared in 64 films between 1937 and 1988. He was born and died in Denmark.

Selected filmography
 Frk. Møllers jubilæum (1937)
 Frk. Vildkat (1942)
 Lady with the Light Gloves (1942)
 Lucky Journey (1947)
 Kampen mod uretten (1949)
 The Poet and the Little Mother (1959)
 Panic in Paradise (1960)
 Harry and the Butler (1961)
 Det støver stadig (1962)
 Ballad of Carl-Henning (1969)
 Girls at Arms 2 (1976)

External links

1907 births
1990 deaths
Danish male film actors
People from Frederiksberg
20th-century Danish male actors